Florelliceps is a monospecific genus of ovoviviparous velvet worm containing the single species Florelliceps stutchburyae. This species is brown with 15 pairs of oncopods (legs). During mating, the male of this species uses a structure on his head to place a spermataphore on the gonopore of the female. The type locality is Mount Warning, New South Wales, Australia.

References 

Onychophorans of Australasia
Onychophoran genera
Monotypic protostome genera